Intimidation is to "make timid or make fearful"; or to induce fear. This includes intentional behaviors of forcing another person to experience general discomfort such as humiliation, embarrassment, inferiority, limited freedom, etc and the victim might be targeted based on multiple factors like gender, race, class, skin color, competency, knowledge, wealth, temperament, etc. Intimidation is done for making the other person submissive (also known as cowing), to destabilize/undermine the other, to force compliance, to hide one's insecurities, to socially valorize oneself, etc. There are active and passive coping mechanisms against intimidation that include, and not limited to not letting the intimidator cross your personal space, addressing their behavior directly, avoiding the person, being gingerly around them, honing breakaway skills, etc. Victims of intimidation would reasonably develop apprehension, experience fear of injury or harm, etc from the unwanted behaviors or tools of intimidation that include, and not limited to, condescending, rudeness, sarcasm, disrespecting, patronizing, degrading, disparaging, etc. However, it is not legally necessary to prove that the behavior caused the victim to experience terror or panic.

Intimidation as a political process is done through national level threats to compel or deter another country to operate in ways the intimidating country wants it to be, an example of political intimidation is putting an embargo on items that the target country depends through import for forcing their compliance. Certain second and third world countries use terrorism as an intimidation tactic. "A terroristic threat is a crime generally involving a threat to commit violence communicated with the intent to terrorize other." Personal intimidation is considered to be a management strategy to signal/inform potential rivals that they may face significant consequences if they act against the person in charge/management or to get workers in line. Certain forms of intimidation like sexual and racial ones are considered as criminal offense in several civilized countries.

Description
Intimidation is derived from the verb intimidate, and it comes from the Latin word intimidat, it means to "make timid." Intimidation is defined as an interaction style that emphasizes on "bullying, exploiting, or manipulating others, solely for one's own advantage." Intimidation may be employed consciously or unconsciously, and a percentage of people who employ it consciously may do so as the result of selfishly rationalized notions of its appropriation, utility or self-empowerment. Intimidation related to prejudice and discrimination may include conduct "which annoys, threatens, intimidates, alarms, or puts a person in fear of their safety...because of a belief or perception regarding such person's race, color, national origin, ancestry, gender, religion, religious practice, age, disability or sexual orientation, regardless of whether the belief or perception is correct."

Intimidation may manifest into coercion or threat with physical contacts, glowering countenance or in its own manner as emotional manipulation, verbal abuse, making someone feel lower than you, purposeful embarrassment and/or actual physical assault. "Behavior may become harassment in forms of epithets, derogatory comments or slurs and lewd propositions, assault, impeding or blocking movement, offensive touching or any physical interference with normal work or movement, and visual insults, such as derogatory posters or cartoons."

Threatening behaviors may be conceptualized as a maladaptive outgrowth of normal competitive urge for interrelational dominance generally seen in animals. Alternatively, intimidation may result from the type of society in which individuals are socialized, as human beings are generally reluctant to engage in confrontation or threaten violence.

Like all behavioral traits, it exists in greater or lesser manifestation in each individual person over time, but may be a more significant "compensatory behavior" for some as opposed to others. Behavioral theorists often see threatening behaviours as a consequence of being threatened by others, including parents, authority figures, playmates and siblings. For self-defense, use of force is justified when a person reasonably believes that it the force is necessary to defend themself or another against the immediate use of unlawful force.

As a criminal offense

United States
"Intimidation" is the name of a criminal offence in several U.S. states. The definitions of the crime of Intimidation differ by state.

In Montana, Intimidation is defined as follows:

Several states have a crime called "ethnic intimidation". For instance, the law of the state of Michigan reads:

Crimes closely related to intimidation are menacing, coercion, terrorizing, and assault.

In California, making criminal threats is a wobbler and may be charged as either a misdemeanor or a felony under California Penal Code 422. A felony criminal threat is a strike under California's three strikes law.

As a civil offense

United States
Intimidation can also be a civil offense, in addition to a criminal offense, in some U.S. states. For example, in Oregon a violation of the state criminal statute for intimidation results in a civil violation. The plaintiff in the civil suit for intimidation may then secure remedies including an injunction or special and general damages.

See also

Notes

Further reading

References

External links

Bullying
Coercion
Crimes
Psychological abuse
Psychological manipulation